Wenceslao Afugu Nkogo Nneme (born 16 September 1992), sportingly known as Lolín, is an Equatoguinean footballer who plays as a forward for Akonangui FC, on loan from Futuro Kings FC, and the Equatorial Guinea national team.

Statistics

International

References

External links

1992 births
Living people
Sportspeople from Malabo
Equatoguinean footballers
Association football forwards
Equatorial Guinea international footballers

Leones Vegetarianos FC players
Futuro Kings FC players
Divisiones Regionales de Fútbol players
Tercera División players
Real Burgos CF footballers
Equatoguinean expatriate footballers
Equatoguinean expatriate sportspeople in Spain
Expatriate footballers in Spain